Luigi Vanvitelli (12 May 1700 – 1 March 1773), known in Dutch as , was an Italian architect and painter. The most prominent 18th-century architect of Italy, he practised a sober classicising academic Late Baroque style that made an easy transition to Neoclassicism.

Biography

Vanvitelli was born in Naples, the son of an Italian woman, Anna Lorenzani, and a Dutch painter of land and cityscapes (veduta), Caspar van Wittel, who also used the name Vanvitelli.

He was trained in Rome by the architect Nicola Salvi, with whom he worked on the construction of the Trevi Fountain. Following his notable successes in the competitions for the facade of the Basilica di San Giovanni in Laterano (1732) and the facade of Palazzo Poli behind the Trevi Fountain, Pope Clement XII sent him to the Marche to build some papal projects. At Ancona in 1732, he devised the vast Lazaretto, a pentagonal building covering more than 20,000 square meters, built to protect the military defensive authorities from the risk of contagious diseases potentially reaching the town with the ships. Later it was used also as a military hospital or as barracks.

In Rome, Vanvitelli stabilized the dome of St. Peter's Basilica when it developed cracks and found time to paint frescos in a chapel at Sant Cecilia in Trastevere. He also built a bridge over the Calore Irpino in Benevento.

Beginning in 1742 Vanvitelli designed (along with Nicola Salvi) the Chapel of St. John the Baptist for King John V of Portugal. It was built in Rome, disassembled in 1747, and shipped to Lisbon, where it was reassembled in the Church of St. Roch (Igreja de São Roque). It was completed in 1750, although the mosaics in it were not finished until 1752. Built of many precious marbles and other costly stones, as well as gilt bronze, it was held to be the most expensive chapel in Europe up to that time.

Reggia di Caserta

Vanvitelli's technical and engineering capabilities, together with his sense of scenographic drama led Carlo VII of Naples (later King Carlos III of Spain) to commission the grand Palace of Caserta, intended as a fresh start for administering the ungovernable Kingdom of Naples. Charles VII of Naples desired a palace which would rival the Palace of Versailles and therefore commissioned Vanvitelli to create the most beautiful palace in Europe. Of all the royal palaces in the world, Caserta is by far the largest in terms of volume, with more than 2 million m³.

Included in the Reggia di Caserta was the fan-shaped Vigna del Ventaglio vineyard. Planted on sloping terrain in the San Leucio frazione near the palace, the vineyard was planted in a semicircle design subdivided into 10 segments (or "fan blades") each planted to a different grape variety. Among the varieties known to have been planted in the Vigna del Ventaglio were native Campanian varieties Pallagrello bianco and Pallagrello nero.

Vanvitelli worked on the project for the rest of his life, for Charles and for his successor Ferdinand IV. In Naples, he designed the city's royal palace (1753) and some aristocratic palaces, and churches such as the new church and monastery for the Missione ai Vergini. His engineering talents were exercised as well: for Caserta, he devised the great aqueduct system that brought water to run the cascades and fountains.

Luigi Vanvitelli died at Caserta in 1773.

Notes

References

External links
Riccardo Cigola, brief biography of Vanvitelli
Architectural and ornament drawings: Juvarra, Vanvitelli, the Bibiena family, & other Italian draughtsmen, an exhibition catalog from The Metropolitan Museum of Art (fully available online as PDF), which contains material on Vanvitelli (see index)

1700 births
1773 deaths
18th-century Neapolitan people
People from Caserta
Italian people of Dutch descent
Architects from Naples
18th-century Italian architects
18th-century Italian painters